Between 1990 and 2010 The Badlees recorded seven full-length albums and two EPs, all of which are studio albums. There have been no live recordings of the band released as of 2010.

Songs (alphabetical)

References
Badlees Discography at Modern Rock Review
[ All Music Guide]

Badlees